Chameleon Days is the fourth studio album by Greek keyboardist and composer Yanni, released on the Private Music label in 1988. It peaked at #2 on Billboard's "Top New Age Albums" chart in the same year.

Its corresponding concert tour was the 1988 Concert Series.

Background
On his new album, Chameleon Days, Yanni reveals a more upbeat, playful and high-spirited side to his nature than many of his fans may be familiar with.  "I tried on this album to incorporate instrumental sounds familiar to anybody.  I used a lot of acoustic piano, synth harmonica, whistle and other sounds to get away from the coldness of pure synthesizer", says Yanni.  Acoustic percussionist, Charlie Adams, joins Yanni on several pieces, adding a more natural dimension.  Yanni's trademark symphonic scope is very apparent on Chameleon Days, as is the intensity of feeling that marked his previous two albums on Private Music.

Album

Track listing

Personnel
All music composed and produced by Yanni
Charlie Adams – Acoustic, Electronic Drums & Percussion

Production
Chameleon Days was recorded in its entirety on keyboards at Yanni's home studio on the 3324 Sony 24-track Digital Recorder
Engineered by:  Yanni
Assistant Engineer:  Charlie Adams
Mastered by:  Chris Bellman
Technical Support:  John Tesh
Technical Advisor:  Jerry Steckling
Photography:  Phillip Dixon
Art Direction & Design:  Norman Moore

1988 Concert Series

Dates
October – December 1988

Cities
6 cities

Set list
Selections from Keys to Imagination, Out of Silence, and Chameleon Days.

Band
Charlie Adams – drums
John Tesh – keyboards
Joyce Imbesi – keyboards

Production
ASASU/ASU Events and SRO Productions

Tour dates

In popular culture
NBC Sports used "Everglade Run" for the closing credits of their Super Bowl XXIII coverage.
CBS Sports used "Marching Season" for their "Dream Season" promos in 1990. NBC Sports also used "Marching Season" for the pregame intro for Super Bowl XXIII.
CBS Sports used "Chasing Shadows" for their Daytona 500 starting grids in 1989, 1992, and 1994.
NBA Hardwood Classics used "Swept Away" in "Come Fly With Me (1989)".

References

External links
Official Website

Yanni albums
1988 albums